Iryna Mikailauna Niafedava (born August 1, 1987) is a Belarusian former swimmer, who specialized in freestyle events. Niafedava qualified for the women's 4×100 m freestyle relay, as a member of the Belarusian team, at the 2004 Summer Olympics in Athens. Teaming with Sviatlana Khakhlova, and sisters Hanna and Maryia Shcherba in heat two, Niafedava swam a third leg and recorded a split of 56.46, but the Belarusians missed the top 8 final by 2.5 seconds, sharing a fifth-place tie and eleventh overall with the Brazilians in a final time of 3:45.38.

References

1987 births
Living people
Olympic swimmers of Belarus
Swimmers at the 2004 Summer Olympics
Belarusian female freestyle swimmers
Sportspeople from Minsk